Lee Jin-ho is a South Korean former professional tennis player.

Lee was a men's doubles bronze medalist for South Korea at the 1990 Asian Games in Beijing. He also was also a South Korean Ghafar Cup representative. While playing on the professional tour he attained a best singles world ranking of 430 and featured as a wildcard in the main draw of the 1990 Korea Open, where he was beaten in the first round by the fourth-seed Kelly Evernden. In the domestic tennis competition he competed for the Korean Air team.

References

External links
 
 

Year of birth missing (living people)
Living people
South Korean male tennis players
Medalists at the 1990 Asian Games
Tennis players at the 1990 Asian Games
Asian Games bronze medalists for South Korea
Asian Games medalists in tennis